Live'r Than You'll Ever Be – Bestival 2007  is a recording of a show by The Kleptones at the 2007 Bestival. The title is taken from the celebrated 1969 Rolling Stones bootleg.

Track listing 
 "Precession" 2:32

 "See" 3:33
 Queen, "One Vision" 
 Quentin Harris, "Let's Be Young"
 KRS-One, "Hip Hop v. Rap"
 Grandmaster Flash and the Furious Five, "The Message"
 Kelis, "Milkshake"
 vocals same as ANatHHg
 "War of Confusion" 3:24
 Edwin Starr, "War"
 Genesis, "Land of Confusion"
 Cypress Hill, "Insane in the Brain"
 "Life in the E-Pro" 1:38
 The Eagles, "Life in the Fast Lane"
 Rage Against the Machine, "Bullet in the Head"
 Beck, "E-Pro"
 Run D.M.C., "King of Rock"
 "Black Cocaine" 1:30
 Run D.M.C., "King of Rock"
 AC/DC, "Back in Black"
 Eric Clapton, "Cocaine"
 "Need You This Way" 2:34
 Aerosmith, "Walk This Way"
 INXS, "Need You Tonight"
 Indeep, "Buffalo Boys"
 "Cowboy's Delight" 0:48
 The Sugarhill Gang, "Rapper's Delight"
 "Delight Years" 2:09
 The Sugarhill Gang, "Rapper's Delight"
 The Rolling Stones, "2000 Light Years from Home"
 David Bowie, "Golden Years"
 Prince, "Housequake"
 "Bite" 3:28
 Ol' Dirty Bastard, "Got Your Money"
 Queen, "Another One Bites the Dust"
 "Can't Breathe" 1:49
 Q-Tip, "Breathe and Stop"
 Hall & Oates, "I Can't Go for That"
 Spin Doctors, "Two Princes"
 "Know How Frogs Function" 3:04
 Shorty Long, "Function at the Junction"
 The Doors, "Peace Frog"
 "Cymbalicker" 4:23
 Aphex Twin, "Windowlicker"
 Bon Jovi, "You Give Love a Bad Name"
 Brian Fahey and his Orchestra, "At the Sign of the Swingin' Cymbal"
 "Underground Hand" 5:34
 Queen, "It's a Kind of Magic"
 Aerosmith, "Dude Looks Like a Lady"
 Nine Inch Nails, "The Hand That Feeds"
 The White Stripes, "The Hardest Button to Button"
 Tori Amos, "Professional Widow" 

 "Wayward Beats" 0:43
 Kansas, "Carry On Wayward Son"
 Justice, "We Are Your Friends"
 "Second Hand Volume" 2:09
 Fleetwood Mac, "Second Hand News"
 M.A.R.R.S., "Pump Up the Volume"
 "Three Girl Bump" 2:26
 Spank Rock (w/Amanda Blank), "Bump"
 Wire, "Three Girl Rhumba"
 Trio, "Da Da Da"
 "Inferno" 2:12
 The Trammps, "Disco Inferno"
 Ash, "Burn Baby Burn"
 Van Halen, "Jump"
 Amy Winehouse, "Rehab"
 Britney Spears, "Toxic"
 "Hella Phat" 3:32
 Leftfield, "Phat Planet"
 Britney Spears, "Toxic"

 No Doubt, "Hella Good"
 Madonna, "Music"
 "Run Outside" 2:53
 Martha and the Vandellas, "Nowhere to Run"
 George Michael, "Outside"
 "Uptight Jet" 3:05
 Stevie Wonder, "Uptight (Everything's All Right)"
 Jet, "Get What You Need"
 "22 Grand Hop" 2:03
 Dead Prez, "It's Bigger Than Hip Hop"
 The Rakes - "22 Grand Job"
 "Break On Miserlou" 6:52
 The Doors, "Break On Through"
 audio clip from Pulp Fiction
 Dick Dale and the Del-Tones, "Miserlou"

External links 
 Announcement on Kleptones blog
 Video clip of the show
 Photo gallery of the show

The Kleptones albums
2007 live albums
2007 remix albums